Uncial 0277 (in the Gregory-Aland numbering), is a Greek-Coptic uncial manuscript of the New Testament. Palaeographically it has been assigned to the 7th or 8th century.

Description 

The codex contains small parts of the Gospel of Matthew 14:22,28-29, on 1 parchment leaf (7.7 cm by 7.6 cm). The text is written in one column per page, 7 lines per page, in uncial letters, the leaf has survived in a fragmentary condition.
It uses pagination, the number of page is 44.

Location 

Currently it is dated by the INTF to the 7th or 8th century.

The manuscript was found in Egypt.

The text was published by Paola Pruneti in 1983.

Currently the codex is housed at the Instituto Papirologico "G. Vitelli" (PSI Inv. CNR 32 C) in Florence.

See also 

 List of New Testament uncials
 Biblical manuscript
 Textual criticism

References

Further reading 

 P. Pruneti, "Trenta testi Greci da papiri letterari e documentari", (Firenze, 1983), pp. 7-9. 

Greek New Testament uncials
7th-century biblical manuscripts